Lombadina is a medium-sized Aboriginal community on the north-western coast of Western Australia on Cape Leveque, north of Broome in the Kimberley region. The name is derived from the Aboriginal word, "Lollmardinard". The community is inhabited by the Bardi people.

Lombadina is part of a single urban area that incorporates Djarindjin and Lombadina. At the 2016 Census, this single urban area had a total population of 397, including 312 Aboriginal and Torres Strait Islander people.

The Catholic mission was established with the help of Thomas Puertollano, a Filipino from Manila, in 191011. In 1916, to avoid it being taken over by the government of Western Australia, the land was bought by an Irishman, the brother of the controversial Redemptorist priest, John Creagh.

Native title 

The community is located within the determined Bardi Jawi (WAD49/1998) native title claim area.

Education 

Children of school age at Lombadina attend the Lombadina-Djarindjin Catholic Primary School. The school runs classes for students from pre-school (4 years old) to Year 10 (16 years old). The total number of students is approximately 90.

Governance 

The community is managed through its incorporated body, Lombadina Aboriginal Corporation, incorporated under the Aboriginal Councils and Associations Act 1976 on 16 July 1987.

Town planning 
Lombadina Layout Plan No.3 was prepared in accordance with State Planning Policy 3.2 Aboriginal Settlements. It was endorsed by the Western Australian Planning Commission in 2001, however has not been endorsed by the community and exists in draft format only.

Notes

References 
Deborah Ruiz Wall, "The Pigram Brothers: a top Aboriginal band talk about their Filipino heritage", Kasama 21(2), April 2007
Regina Ganter, "Mixed Relations: Asian Aboriginal Contact in North Australia", University of Western Australia Press, 2006

External links 
Office of the Registrar of Indigenous Corporations
Native Title Claimant application summary

Towns in Western Australia
Aboriginal communities in Kimberley (Western Australia)
Australian Aboriginal missions